Ralph Kok (born 18 October 1967) is a former professional tennis player from the Netherlands.

Career
Kok and partner Christian Bergström made the doubles quarter-finals of the 1989 ABN World Tennis Tournament in Rotterdam. He reached the second round of the singles at the same tournament in 1993, having a win over world number 68 Patrik Kühnen.

The Dutchman was beaten by Dan Goldie in the opening round of the 1990 Wimbledon Championships.

He now coaches Arantxa Rus and Anastasiya Yakimova.

References

1967 births
Living people
Dutch male tennis players